The Scaled Composites Model 81 Catbird is a high-efficiency five-seat single-engine all-composite general aviation aircraft designed by Burt Rutan. It is unusual in that it incorporates both a small forward wing and a small conventional horizontal stabilizer on the tail.

Design and development
The Catbird was designed by Burt Rutan while his company, Scaled Composites, was owned by Beechcraft. The design was intended to replace the long-produced Bonanza. The financial situation of Beech at the time, and competing projects, prevented consideration of commercial production. In 1988 Beechcraft sold Scaled Composites to the partnership of Rutan and the Wyman-Gordon Company, who also acquired the rights to a number of the designs, including Model 81 Catbird.

The aircraft was stored inverted from the ceiling of Scaled Composites' Mojave hangar until April 2011. The aircraft was restored to flying condition by Zach Reeder, Jim Reed and Mike Melvill. Catbird's second first flight was July 7, 2011.

World records
Catbird holds the world record for speed over a closed circuit of 5,000 km without payload of 334.44 km/h, set in 2014 in Category C-1c, Landplanes with take-off weights from 1000 to 1750 kg.

The aircraft won the CAFE Foundation's 1988 California CAFE 400 race flown by Mike Melvill, in which aircraft compete for performance efficiency, as measured by fuel consumption, speed and payload.

In 2014, the Catbird set another record, for speed over a closed 2,000 km course, from Mojave to EAA AirVenture Oshkosh, with an average speed of 339.50 km/h (211 mph).

Specifications (Model 81 Catbird)

See also

References

External links

 Images of Catbird at EAA AirVenture Oshkosh
 Catbird returns to Oshkosh, JAMES WYNBRAND, 2011
 Burt Rutan's Catbird

Catbird
Three-surface aircraft
Canard aircraft
Rutan aircraft
1980s United States experimental aircraft
Aircraft first flown in 1988